Naomi Davis Shelton (born Naomi Virginia Davis; October 14, 1942 – February 17, 2021) was an American gospel, blues, funk, and soul musician, who played traditional black gospel, deep funk, northern soul and rhythm and blues styles of music. She started her music career, in 1958, after she graduated from high school in Alabama. Davis was the lead singer of The Gospel Queens from Brooklyn, later known as Naomi Shelton & the Gospel Queens.

Early life
Shelton was born Naomi Virginia Davis on October 14, 1942, in Midway, Alabama, where she was the younger sister of Hattie Mae and Annie Ruth. She was raised in the church at Mount Coney Baptist Church, by her parents. They sang together, until the first one graduated from high school, eventually she would graduate in 1958, first going to Florida, then she settled in Brooklyn, during 1963. She did the job of a maid by doing cleaning work at houses in Brooklyn, while she was singing at the Night Cap, during the evenings. She was married to Dennis Shelton.

Music career
She started professional singing right after she graduated from high school in 1958, with her first recording deal falling through in 2002 with Desco Records, after they liquidated. Shelton would eventually get a recording contract with Daptone Records, where she was the lead singer of The Gospel Queens, while they have released two albums. She appears as herself in the 2014 film, Song One.

References

External links
The Atlantic video

1942 births
2021 deaths
20th-century African-American women singers
African-American Christians
Singers from Alabama
Musicians from Brooklyn
Songwriters from Alabama
Songwriters from New York (state)
Daptone Records artists
People from Midway, Alabama
African-American women songwriters
21st-century African-American women singers